Giuseppe Antonio Panico (born 10 May 1997) is an Italian footballer who plays as a striker for  club Lucchese on loan from Crotone.

Club career 
Panico is a youth exponent from Genoa. He made his Serie A debut on 31 May 2015 against Sassuolo replacing Maxime Lestienne after 81 minutes in a 3–1 away defeat.

On 30 June 2016 Panico joined Cesena on a 2-year loan.

On 13 July 2018, Panico joined Cittadella.

On 1 September 2020 he signed with Novara.

On 12 August 2021 he moved to Juve Stabia. On 18 January 2022 he joined Pro Vercelli.

On 19 July 2022, Panico signed a three-year contract with Crotone. On 12 January 2023, he was loaned by Lucchese.

International
He represented Italy national under-19 football team at the 2016 UEFA European Under-19 Championship, in which Italy was the runner-up and played in every game except the final.

A year later, he played for Italy at the 2017 FIFA U-20 World Cup, scoring two goals and the decisive penalty shoot-out kick that brought Italy 3rd place over Uruguay.

References

External links
 

1997 births
People from Ottaviano
Footballers from Campania
Living people
Italian footballers
Italy youth international footballers
Association football forwards
Genoa C.F.C. players
A.C. Cesena players
S.S. Teramo Calcio players
A.S. Cittadella players
Novara F.C. players
S.S. Juve Stabia players
F.C. Pro Vercelli 1892 players
F.C. Crotone players
Lucchese 1905 players
Serie A players
Serie B players
Serie C players